Princess Feodora of Saxe-Meiningen (Feodora Karola Charlotte Marie Adelheid Auguste Mathilde; 29 May 1890 – 12 March 1972) was the eldest child of Prince Friedrich Johann of Saxe-Meiningen, a younger son of Georg II, Duke of Saxe-Meiningen, and Countess Adelaide of Lippe-Biesterfeld, a daughter of Ernst, Count of Lippe-Biesterfeld. By marriage, she was known as Grand Duchess of Saxe-Weimar-Eisenach.

Biography

Marriage
During a summer visit to the palace Wilhelmshöhe, Feodora was urged by her kinsman Emperor Wilhelm II to make a match with the widowed Wilhelm Ernst, Grand Duke of Saxe-Weimar-Eisenach. He had been serving with the Prussian artillery during that time. Despite his role in their engagement however, Emperor Wilhelm refused to attend the wedding. This caused much speculation, as he and his wife were very close to the Grand Duke. This was seen by many to be due to mutual ill will between Wilhelm and Feodora's grandfather Georg II, Duke of Saxe-Meiningen, whose morganatic wedding to Ellen Franz had displeased many royal personages like Wilhelm. Georg was the only ruler of a reigning German dynasty who had never visited the Emperor upon his accession in 1888, and who, in turn, had never received any imperial German visitors at his own court. Wilhelm's disapproval was even more surprising in that he had recently allowed the marriage between a Hohenzollern dynast (Prince Frederick William of Prussia) with a much lower-ranked member of the nobility (Princess Agatha of Hohenlohe-Schillingsfürst); it was considered odd that he refused to recognize one equal marriage yet acknowledged another lesser match, especially when the latter was within his own family and subject to the rigid Hohenzollern house laws.

The Emperor's boycott of the wedding was so strongly resented in Saxe-Meiningen that, when newspapers announced that Wilhelm would not be attending the wedding, the official communication from the royal palace declared that he had never been invited.

On 14 January 1910 in Meiningen, Feodora was married to Wilhelm Ernst. She was his second wife (his first wife Princess Caroline Reuss, Elder Line had died childless after eighteen months of marriage in 1905). This first marriage had been unhappy, as Karoline disliked the Weimar court, eventually fleeing to Switzerland. After being persuaded to return to court, her death soon after was considered by some to be suicide.

Court life

Feodora's marriage was unhappy; the Weimar court was generally considered to be one of the most stifling and etiquette-driven in Germany. One source recounted:"It envelops royalty there in a species of captivity, and while the grand duke lends thereto and is too conservative to admit of any change, it crushes with its trammels the more spirited members of the family".

Feodora was unhappy in such an environment; at the age of 23, reports leaked out that she was staying at a sanatorium for her health. She was stricken with a severe attack of measles and scarlet fever, which she had acquired while visiting an asylum she had founded. Her increased attentions to this particular asylum were attributed to her unhappiness at court, and seen as an escape. The extreme etiquette also caused there to be a distance between herself and the Grand Duke, as well as with their young children. While reports did not call her husband particularly cruel, he was, according to one source:
"One of the wealthiest sovereigns in Europe; stolid, well-behaved, imbued with great pride of race, and a strict sense of what is due to the anointed of the Lord. He is also one of the most severely respected and proper of German rulers...the Grand Duke is very dull, and his court and environment reflect his character in this respect to such a point that Weimar has become the dreariest capital in Europe".

Feodora was very popular among the middle and lower classes of Weimar; this was largely attributed to her charm and kindness to the poor and suffering.

Later life
On 9 November 1918 Wilhelm Ernst—along with the rest of the German monarchs following the defeat of Germany in World War I—was forced to abdicate. His throne and all his lands were relinquished and he fled with his family to the family estate in Silesia, where he died four years later. Feodora died on 12 March 1972 in Freiburg im Breisgau, Germany.

Issue
Feodora and her husband had four children:

Ancestry

References

|-

Princesses of Saxe-Meiningen
House of Saxe-Weimar-Eisenach
Grand Duchesses of Saxe-Weimar-Eisenach
1890 births
1972 deaths
Nobility from Hanover